(The Clemency of Titus), K. 621, is an opera seria in two acts composed by Wolfgang Amadeus Mozart to an Italian libretto by Caterino Mazzolà, after Pietro Metastasio. The work premiered on 6 September 1791 at the Estates Theatre in Prague.

Background 

In 1791, the last year of his life, Mozart was already well advanced in writing  by July when he was asked to compose an opera seria. The commission came from the impresario Domenico Guardasoni, who lived in Prague and who had been charged by the Estates of Bohemia with providing a new work to celebrate the coronation of Leopold II, Holy Roman Emperor, as King of Bohemia. The coronation had been planned by the Estates in order to ratify a political agreement between Leopold and the nobility of Bohemia (it had rescinded efforts of Leopold's brother Joseph II to initiate a program to free the serfs of Bohemia and increase the tax burden of aristocratic landholders). Leopold desired to pacify the Bohemian nobility in order to forestall revolt and strengthen his empire in the face of political challenges engendered by the French Revolution. The ceremony was to take place on 6 September; Guardasoni had been approached about the opera in June. No opera of Mozart was more clearly pressed into the service of a political agenda than La clemenza di Tito, in this case to promote the reactionary political and social policies of an aristocratic elite. No evidence exists to evaluate Mozart's attitude toward this, or even whether he was aware of the internal political conflicts raging in the kingdom of Bohemia in 1791.

In a contract dated 8 July, Guardasoni promised that he would engage a castrato "of leading quality" (this seems to have mattered more than who wrote the opera); that he would "have the libretto caused to be written...and to be set to music by a distinguished maestro". The time was tight and Guardasoni had a get-out clause: if he failed to secure a new text, he would resort to La clemenza di Tito, a libretto written more than half a century earlier by Pietro Metastasio (1698–1782).

Metastasio's libretto had already been set by nearly 40 composers; the story is based on the life of Roman Emperor Titus, from some brief hints in The Lives of the Caesars by the Roman writer Suetonius, and was elaborated by Metastasio in 1734 for the Italian composer Antonio Caldara. Among later settings were Gluck's in 1752 and Josef Mysliveček's version in 1774. Mozart was definitely familiar with the libretto before composition; in 1770, he saw a production with his father of 's setting in Cremona. There would be three further settings after 1791. Mozart was not Guardasoni's first choice. Instead, he approached Antonio Salieri, the most distinguished composer of Italian opera in Vienna and head of the music establishment at the imperial court. But Salieri was too busy, and he declined the commission, although he did attend the coronation.

The libretto was edited into a more useful state by the court poet Caterino Mazzolà. Unusually, in Mozart's personal catalogue of compositions, Mazzolà is credited for his revision with the note that the libretto had been "reworked into a true opera". Mazzolà conflated the original three act libretto into two acts, and none of the original Metastasio arias are from the original middle act. Mazzolà replaced a lot of the dialogue with ensembles and wrote a new act one finale, cobbled from lines in the original libretto, which presents the uprising, whereas Metastasio merely describes it.

Guardasoni's experience of Mozart's work on Don Giovanni convinced him that the younger composer was more than capable of working on the tightest deadline. Mozart readily accepted the commission given his fee would be twice the price of a similar opera commissioned in Vienna. Mozart's earliest biographer Niemetschek alleged that the opera was completed in just 18 days, and in such haste that the secco recitatives were supplied by another composer, probably Franz Xaver Süssmayr, believed to have been Mozart's pupil. Although no other documentation exists to confirm Süssmayr's participation, none of the secco recitatives are in Mozart's autograph, and it is known that Süssmayr traveled with Mozart to Prague a week before the premiere to help with rehearsals, proofreading, and copying. It has been suggested by scholars of Mozart that he had been working on the opera much longer, perhaps since 1789; however, all such theories have now been thoroughly refuted in the English-language musicological literature. The opera may not have been written in just 18 days, but it certainly ranks with Rossini's L'italiana in Algeri, Il barbiere di Siviglia and La Cenerentola as one of the operas written in the shortest amount of time that is still frequently performed today.

It is not known what Leopold thought of the opera written in his honor.

Performance history 

The premiere took place a few hours after Leopold's coronation. H. C. Robbins Landon says that it is "most unlikely" that Mozart himself was the conductor, despite what has been commonly asserted. The role of Sesto was taken by castrato soprano, Domenico Bedini. The opera was first performed publicly on 6 September 1791 at the Estates Theatre in Prague. While the orchestra was that of the theatre, the clarinet player Anton Stadler had journeyed to Prague with Mozart, and played in the orchestra. It was for him that Mozart wrote two very prominent obbligati: for basset clarinet in Sesto's aria "Parto, parto, ma tu ben mio", and for basset horn in Vitellia's aria "Non più di fiori".

Excerpts from the opera were performed on 28 February 1796 at the Berlin Royal Opera, with Margarete Luise Schick, Henriette Righini, and Constanze Mozart performing.

The opera remained popular for many years after Mozart's death. It was the first full Mozart opera to reach London, receiving its première there at His Majesty's Theatre on 27 March 1806. The cast included John Braham, whose long-time companion Nancy Storace had been the first Susanna in The Marriage of Figaro in Vienna. However, as it was only played once, it does not appear to have attracted much interest. As far as can be gathered, it was not staged in London again until at the St Pancras Festival in 1957. The first performance at La Scala in Milan was on 26 December 1818. The North American premiere was staged on 4 August 1952 at the Berkshire Music Center in Tanglewood. For a long time, Mozart scholars regarded Tito as an inferior effort of the composer. Alfred Einstein in 1945 wrote that it was "customary to speak disparagingly of La clemenza di Tito and to dismiss it as the product of haste and fatigue", and he continues the disparagement to some extent by condemning the characters as puppets – e.g., "Tito is nothing but a mere puppet representing magnanimity" – and claiming that the opera seria was already a moribund form. However, in recent years the opera has undergone something of a reappraisal. Stanley Sadie considered it to show Mozart "responding with music of restraint, nobility and warmth to a new kind of stimulus". The opera retains a reasonably high profile, and is in the lower reaches of the 'Top 50' performed at major houses, worldwide.

At the Salzburg Festival 2017, Peter Sellars directed his interpretation of the opera, as "a vision of peaceful coexistence", "reaching far beyond the historical context", a coproduction with the Dutch National Opera, Amsterdam, and the Deutsche Oper Berlin. Conducted by Teodor Currentzis, it premiered on 27 July 2017 at the Felsenreitschule in Salzburg.

The opera was also performed as part of Glyndebourne's 2017 summer festival. In 2019 the Los Angeles Opera put on the work for the first time in its history in an all new production, conducted by James Conlon and starring Russell Thomas in the title role and Elizabeth DeShong as Sesto. In the same year the opera was performed at the Metropolitan Opera in New York City and broadcast on April 20, 2019.

Roles

Instrumentation 
The opera is scored for 2 flutes, 2 oboes, 2 clarinets, (1 also basset clarinet and basset horn), 2 bassoons, 2 French horns, 2 trumpets, timpani and strings. Basso continuo in recitativi secchi is made up of cembalo and violoncello. Period performance practice often uses a fortepiano.

Synopsis 
Place and time: Ancient Rome, in the year 79.

Act 1 
Vitellia, daughter of the late emperor Vitellius (who had been deposed by Tito's father Vespasian), wants revenge against Tito. She stirs up Tito's vacillating friend Sesto, who is in love with her, to act against him (duet "Come ti piace, imponi"). But when she hears word that Tito has sent Berenice of Cilicia, of whom she was jealous, back to Jerusalem, Vitellia tells Sesto to delay carrying out her wishes, hoping Tito will choose her (Vitellia) as his empress (aria "Deh, se piacer mi vuoi").

Tito, however, decides to choose Sesto's sister Servilia to be his empress, and orders Annio (Sesto's friend) to bear the message to Servilia (aria "Del più sublime soglio"). Since Annio and Servilia, unbeknownst to Tito, are in love, this news is very unwelcome to both (duet "Ah, perdona al primo affetto"). Servilia decides to tell Tito the truth but also says that if Tito still insists on marrying her, she will obey. Tito thanks the gods for Servilia's truthfulness, and immediately forswears the idea of coming between her and Annio (aria "Ah, se fosse intorno al trono").

In the meantime, however, Vitellia has heard the news about Tito's interest in Servilia and is again boiling with jealousy. She urges Sesto to assassinate Tito. He agrees, singing one of the opera's most famous arias ("Parto, parto, ma tu, ben mio" with basset clarinet obbligato). Almost as soon as he leaves, Annio and the guard Publio arrive to escort Vitellia to Tito, who has now chosen her as his empress. She is torn with feelings of guilt and worry over what she has sent Sesto to do.

Sesto, meanwhile, is at the Capitol wrestling with his conscience (recitativo "Oh Dei, che smania è questa"), as he and his accomplices go about to burn it down. The other characters (except Tito) enter severally and react with horror to the burning Capitol. Sesto reenters and announces that he saw Tito slain, but Vitellia stops him from incriminating himself as the assassin. The others lament Tito in a slow, mournful conclusion to act one.

Act 2 
The act begins with Annio telling Sesto that Emperor Tito is in fact alive and has just been seen; in the smoke and chaos, Sesto mistook another for Tito. Sesto wants to leave Rome, but Annio persuades him not to (aria "Torna di Tito a lato"). Soon Publio arrives to arrest Sesto, bearing the news that it was one of Sesto's co-conspirators who dressed himself in Tito's robes and was stabbed, though not mortally, by Sesto. The Senate tries Sesto as Tito waits impatiently, sure that his friend will be exonerated; Publio expresses his doubts (aria "Tardi s'avvede d'un tradimento") and leaves for the Senate. Annio begs Tito to show clemency towards his friend (aria "Tu fosti tradito"). Publio returns and announces that Sesto has been found guilty and an anguished Tito must sign Sesto's death sentence.

He decides to send for Sesto first, attempting to obtain further details about the plot. Sesto takes all the guilt on himself and says he deserves death (rondo "Deh, per questo istante solo"), so Tito tells him he shall have it and sends him away. But after an extended internal struggle, Tito tears up the execution warrant for Sesto. He determines that, if the world wishes to accuse him (Tito) of anything, it should charge him with showing too much mercy, rather than with having a vengeful heart (aria "Se all'impero").

Vitellia at this time is torn by guilt, but Servilia warns her that tears alone will not save Sesto (aria "S'altro che lagrime"). Vitellia finally decides to confess all to Tito, giving up her hopes of empire (rondo "Non più di fiori" with basset horn obbligato). In the amphitheatre, the condemned (including Sesto) are waiting to be thrown to the wild beasts. Tito is about to show mercy, when Vitellia offers her confession as the instigator of Sesto's plot. Although shocked, the emperor includes her in the general clemency he offers (recitativo accompagnato "Ma che giorno è mai questo?"). The opera concludes with all the subjects praising the extreme generosity of Tito; he then asks that the gods cut short his days, should he ever cease to care for the good of Rome.

Recordings 
Many recordings have been made, including the following:

See also 

List of operas by Mozart

References 
Citations

Sources

Further reading
 Rice, John A. (1991), W. A. Mozart, "La clemenza di Tito". Cambridge: Cambridge University Press.
 Robins, Brian, "La clemenza di Tito – Mozart's Operatic Failure?" on earlymusicworld.com Retrieved 23 November 2011.
 Complete book

External links 

 
 Libretto, critical editions, diplomatic editions, source evaluation (German only), links to online DME recordings; Digital Mozart Edition
 
 Libretto (Italian, English)

Operas by Wolfgang Amadeus Mozart
Italian-language operas
Opera seria
1791 operas
Operas set in Italy
Music dedicated to nobility or royalty
Operas
Cultural depictions of Titus
Leopold II, Holy Roman Emperor